Gornje Raštane is a village in a municipality Sveti Filip i Jakov, in Zadar County, Croatia.

References

Populated places in Zadar County